Lexmark International, Inc. is a privately held American company that manufactures laser printers and imaging products. The company is headquartered in Lexington, Kentucky. Since 2016 it has been jointly owned by a consortium of three multinational  companies: Apex Technology, PAG Asia Capital, and Legend Capital.

History

Lexmark was formed on March 27, 1991 when investment firm Clayton & Dubilier completed a leveraged buyout of IBM Information Products Corporation, the printer, typewriter, and keyboard operations of IBM. Lexmark became a publicly traded company on the New York Stock Exchange on November 15, 1995.

By 2016, the company struggled to keep corporate clients that are cutting costs and the consumers who are shifting to mobile devices from personal computers. It was reported in April 2016 that Lexmark would be acquired by Apex Technology and PAG Asia Capital for US$3.6 billion. Lexmark was set to be acquired at $40.50 per share in the transaction. Initial talks for the acquisition were begun at the Remax World Expo in 2015. The deal was closed on November 29, 2016. Lexmark stated that its headquarters would remain in Lexington, and that its enterprise software line of business would be spun off and "rebranded" to Kofax. As part of the sale, the Perceptive Business Unit portion of Lexmark's Enterprise Software Services division (e.g. their non-Kofax branded document management products) was sold to the Thoma Bravo management group who agreed to in-turn sell the Perceptive Business Unit to the Hyland Corporation. The Kofax branded applications remained as part of Lexmark, but other document management systems like Perceptive Content and NolijWeb and products like Intelligent Capture (formerly "Brainware") and Enterprise Search (formerly "ISYS") were absorbed by Hyland.

Operations
The firm's corporate headquarters is located in Lexington and R&D offices are distributed globally with additional R&D facilities located in Boulder, Colorado, US; Lenexa, Kansas, US; Cebu, Philippines; Kolkata, West Bengal, India; Berlin, Germany; Stockholm, Sweden and Irvine, California, US. Lexmark has offices throughout North and South America, Asia, Africa and Europe. As of July 2018, the company had approximately 9,000 employees worldwide.

Acquisitions
 In May 2010, Lexmark acquired Perceptive Software for $280 million to build upon its software offerings. Perceptive Software was a software firm that developed enterprise content management ("Perceptive Content", ″ImageNow") and document output management applications.
 In 2011, Lexmark International purchased Netherlands-based Pallas Athena in a cash transaction valued at approximately $50.2 million. The purchase of Pallas Athena added business process management, document output management and process mining software capabilities to Lexmark's services.
 In March 2012, Lexmark announced the acquisition of Luxembourg-based BDGB Enterprise, including its U.S. subsidiary Brainware, Inc., for a cash purchase price of approximately $148 million. Brainware's intelligent data capture platform extracted critical information from paper and electronic documents, validated the extracted data and passed it to customers' data management systems, enterprise resource planning (ERP) and/or financial management systems.
 In March 2012, Lexmark acquired Australia-based ISYS Search Software and U.S.-based Nolij Corporation, both for $32 million. ISYS built enterprise search solutions and Nolij developed Web-based document imaging and workflow software.
 In January 2013, Lexmark acquired Minnesota-based Acuo Technologies for $45 million. Acuo Technologies developed medical imaging document management software.
 In March 2013, Lexmark announced acquisitions of AccessVia and Twistage for a combined purchase price of approximately $31.5 million.
 In late August 2013, Lexmark signed an agreement to acquire Germany-based Saperion AG. Saperion was a developer and provider of enterprise content management and business process management (BPM) software in Europe. The company was purchased for $72 million.
 In early October 2013, Lexmark acquired PACSGEAR, a provider of connectivity solutions for medical image management and electronic health records. The company was purchased for approximately $54 million.
 In September 2014, Lexmark acquired Stockholm, Sweden-based ReadSoft for $251 million. ReadSoft was a financial process automation solutions company that specialized in software solutions for document process automation on-premises or in the cloud.
 In May 2015, Lexmark announced that it had acquired Kofax for roughly $1 billion. Kofax, headquartered in Irvine, California, US was a provider of smart process applications. They combined capture, process management, analytics and mobile capabilities to organizations. This line of business was, in turn, spun off from Lexmark when it was acquired by Apex Technology in November 2016.

Divestitures
 In August 2012, Lexmark announced that it would stop production of its inkjet printer line. In April 2013, Funai Electric Company, Ltd. announced that it had signed an agreement to acquire Lexmark's inkjet technology and assets for approximately $100 million (approximately ¥9.5 billion). Funai acquired more than 1,500 inkjet patents, Lexmark's inkjet-related research and development assets and tools, all outstanding shares and the manufacturing facility of Lexmark International (Philippines), Inc., and other inkjet-related technologies and assets.

 In 1996, Lexmark International was prepared to shut their Lexington keyboard factory where they produced Model M buckling-spring keyboards. IBM, their principal customer—and the Model M's original designer and patent holder—had decided to remove the Model M from its product line in favor of cheaper Asian-made rubber-dome keyboards. Rather than seeing its production come to an end, a group of former Lexmark and IBM employees purchased the license, tooling and design rights for buckling-spring technology and, in April 1996, reestablished the business as Unicomp.

Legal cases
Lexmark pioneered the use of profits from ink cartridges as a business model, with the result of modifying the legal models of product ownership and patent exhaustion over several years.

A court victory in 2005 was handed to Lexmark in the case of ACRA v. Lexmark. This case states that Lexmark can enforce the "single use only" policy written on the side of Lexmark printer cartridge boxes sold to certain large customers at a discount, with the understanding that the customers will return the cartridges to Lexmark after using them. This means that these customers can face lawsuits if they breach the agreements, and do not return the cartridges.

Also in 2005, Lexmark suffered a legal defeat in the case of Arizona Cartridge Remanufacturers Ass'n Inc. v. Lexmark International Inc., when the U.S. Supreme Court rejected Lexmark's petition for a writ of certiorari, thereby rejecting their attempt to have the Court hear their case. In this case, the defendant was a manufacturer of microchips that allowed third-party ink and toner cartridges to work on printers, including many manufactured by Lexmark. Such printers incorporated a feature that would require authentication from a microchip within the ink/toner cartridge in order to function; this was designed to prohibit users from refilling the cartridges. However, a recent firmware update allowed Lexmark to prevent end users from refilling ink cartridges or using third-party ink cartridges.

Lexmark also lost in the Supreme Court case Impression Products, Inc. v. Lexmark International, Inc. in 1 7-1 ruling that reversed and remanded a Federal Circuit court decision (30 May 2017):

See also
 List of Lexmark products

References

External links

 EFF: Lexmark v. Static Control Components Inc.

 
Computer printer companies
Companies based in Lexington, Kentucky
Electronics companies established in 1991
1991 establishments in Kentucky
2016 mergers and acquisitions
Private equity portfolio companies